
Year 685 (DCLXXXV) was a common year starting on Sunday (link will display the full calendar) of the Julian calendar. The denomination 685 for this year has been used since the early medieval period, when the Anno Domini calendar era became the prevalent method in Europe for naming years.

Events 
 By place 
 Byzantine Empire 
 September – Emperor Constantine IV dies of dysentery at Constantinople after a 17-year reign, and is succeeded by his 16-year-old son Justinian II.

 Europe 
 Kuber, brother of Asparukh of Bulgaria, defeats the Avars in Syrmia (Pannonia). He leads his followers of around 70,000 people to Macedonia (modern North Macedonia).

 Britain 
 May 20 – Battle of Dun Nechtain: The Picts under King Bridei III revolt against their Northumbrian overlords. Cuthbert, bishop of Lindisfarne, advises King Ecgfrith of Northumbria (Bridei's cousin) not to invade Pictland (modern Scotland). Undeterred, Ecgfrith marches his army north to engage the enemy near Dunnichen. The Picts, possibly with Scottish and Strathclyde Briton help, defeat the Saxon guard, killing Ecgfrith, who has reigned for 15 years, routing his army and forcing the Anglo-Saxons to withdraw south of the River Forth.
 King Centwine of Wessex dies after a 9-year reign and is succeeded by his distant cousin, Cædwalla, who manages to fully re-unite the sub-kingdoms of Wessex. He attacks Sussex with a large army, and kills King Æthelwealh in battle, in the South Downs (Hampshire). He is expelled by Æthelwealh's ealdormen, Berthun and Andhun, who jointly rule the South Saxons. Cædwalla invades Kent, lays it waste, and carries off an immense booty. 
 Aldfrith, illegitimate half-brother of Ecgfrith, becomes (possibly with Irish and Scottish help) king of Northumbria. He is brought from Iona (Inner Hebrides), where he is studying for a career in the church.
 King Eadric revolts against his uncle Hlothhere, and defeats him in battle. He becomes sole ruler of Kent until his death in 686.

 Arabian Empire 
 Battle of 'Ayn al-Warda: An Umayyad army (20,000 men) under Husayn ibn Numayr defeats the pro-Alid Kufans at Ras al-'Ayn (Syria).
 May 7 – Caliph Marwan I dies at Damascus, and is succeeded by his son Abd al-Malik ibn Marwan.

 China 
 Empress Wu Zetian sends a pair of giant pandas to the Japanese court of Emperor Tenmu, as a diplomatic gift (approximate date).
 Wu Zetian exiles her son Zhong Zong, former emperor of the Tang Dynasty, and his family to the island of Fang Zhou. 

 By topic 
 Religion 
 May 8 – Pope Benedict II dies at Rome after a reign of less than 11 months. He is succeeded by John V as the 82nd pope.
 John Maron is elected as the first patriarch in the Maronite Church (approximate date).

Births 
 September 8 – Xuan Zong, emperor of the Tang Dynasty (d. 762)
 Leo III, emperor of the Byzantine Empire (d. 741)
 Li Xianhui, princess of the Tang Dynasty (d. 701)
 Miao Jinqing, chancellor of the Tang Dynasty (d. 765)
 Pelagius, king of Asturias (approximate date)
 Theodbert, duke of Bavaria (approximate date)

Deaths 
 May 8 – Benedict II, pope of the Catholic Church (b. 635)
 May 20 – Ecgfrith, king of Northumbria
 Æthelwealh, king of Sussex
 Anania Shirakatsi, Armenian astronomer (b. 610)
 Beornhæth, Anglo-Saxon nobleman
 Centwine, king of Wessex (approximate date)
 Constantine IV, Byzantine emperor (b. 652)
 Hlothhere, king of Kent
 Liu Rengui, chancellor of the Tang Dynasty (b. 602)

References

Sources 

 

 

da:680'erne#685